This is a list of the Australian species of the family Carposinidae. It also acts as an index to the species articles and forms part of the full List of moths of Australia.

Bondia attenuatana Meyrick, 1882
Bondia caseata Meyrick, 1910
Bondia digramma Meyrick, 1910
Bondia dissolutana Meyrick, 1882
Bondia maleficana Meyrick, 1882
Bondia nigella Newman, 1856
Carposina autologa Meyrick, 1910
Carposina chaetolopha Turner, 1926
Carposina hyperlopha Turner, 1947
Carposina latebrosa Meyrick, 1910
Carposina leptoneura Meyrick, 1920
Carposina loxolopha Turner, 1947
Carposina mediella (Walker, 1866)
Carposina mimodes Meyrick, 1910
Carposina nesolocha Meyrick, 1910
Carposina neurophorella (Meyrick, 1879)
Carposina orphania Meyrick, 1910
Carposina perileuca (Lower, 1908)
Carposina petraea Meyrick, 1910
Carposina phaeochyta (Turner, 1946)
Carposina pinarodes Meyrick, 1910
Carposina poliosticha Turner, 1947
Carposina smaragdias Turner, 1916
Carposina tanaoptera Turner, 1947
Carposina taractis Meyrick, 1910
Carposina telesia Meyrick, 1910
Coscinoptycha improbana Meyrick, 1881
Epicopistis pleurospila Turner, 1933
Meridarchis zymota Meyrick, 1910
Paramorpha aplegia (Turner, 1916)
Paramorpha aquilana Meyrick, 1881
Paramorpha cylindrica Meyrick, 1921
Paramorpha eburneola Turner, 1927
Paramorpha hapalopis Meyrick, 1910
Paramorpha injusta Meyrick, 1913
Paramorpha rhachias Meyrick, 1910
Paramorpha semotheta Meyrick, 1910
Paramorpha tenuistria Turner, 1947
Sosineura mimica (Lower, 1893)

External links 
Carposinidae at Australian Faunal Directory

Australia